Radio Navtarang is a  Hindi radio station in Sydney, Australia. It is owned by Navtarang Media Group.

The station is also available online via live streaming.

References 

Hindi-language radio stations
Radio stations in Sydney
Ethnic radio stations in Australia
Mass media of Indian diaspora